Natrinema (common abbreviation Nnm.) is a genus of the Natrialbaceae.

Taxonomy
As of 2022, there are 18 species validly published in the genus Natrinema. 

Natrinema is related to the genus Haloterrigena, established in 1999, resulting in confusion about taxon limits and several species apparently being assigned to the wrong genus. Based on phylogenomic analysis, eight species from Haloterrigena as well as Halopiger salifodinae were transferred to Natrinema in 2022.

References

Further reading

Scientific journals

Scientific books

Scientific databases

External links

Archaea genera
Taxa described in 1998